Young Kwok Lee (September 5, 1947 – January 27, 2021) was a Chinese-American activist, community organizer, photographer, journalist and the unofficial Asian American Photographer Laureate. He called himself an "ABC from NYC...yielding a camera to slay injustices against APAs."  His work chronicled and explored the diversity and nuances of Asian American culture often ignored and overlooked by mainstream media and made sure Asian American history was included as a part of American history.

Early life and education
Lee was born on September 5, 1947, in Queens, New York City. He was the second child of Lee Yin Chuck and Jung See Lee, both of whom immigrated to the United States from China. His father had a laundry business and was a soldier in World War II; his mother worked as a seamstress. He had an older sister (Fee) and 3 younger brothers (John, James, and Richard). Lee attended Jamaica High School, before going on to study American history at Queens College in 1965.

Lee taught himself photography, and borrowed cameras to practice because he was unable to afford his own. He said his work was inspired by an 1869 photo he saw in his social studies text that celebrated the completion of the transcontinental railroad at Promontory Summit, Utah. Its construction had involved thousands of Chinese workers, but the photo depicting representative laborers showed none of them.

Photographic work
Lee's work has documented key events in Asian American political history. His 1975 photograph of a Chinese American man being beaten by members of the New York City Police Department was featured by the New York Post. The day that the picture was published 20,000 people marched from Chinatown to City Hall protesting against police brutality.

Lee also photographed the protests that took place after the 1982 murder of Vincent Chin in Michigan. Chin was a young Chinese American man living in Detroit and was killed by Ronald Ebens, a superintendent at Chrysler Motors, and his stepson. The perpetrators attacked Chin, of Chinese descent, after mistaking him for being from Japan, as Japanese companies were blamed for the loss of American auto industry jobs.

Lee's title of "undisputed unofficial Asian American Photographer Laureate" was self-proclaimed, but never questioned. His photographs documented the daily lives of Asian Americans as well as various historical moments in American history. Lee said his camera was a sword to combat racial injustice, to memorialize and make visible those who would otherwise be invisible by documenting the lives of minority-American cultures and communities.

Han Zhang in The New Yorker, summarized the cultural impact of his work as follows: "Lee was to Chinatown what Bill Cunningham was to the sartorialists of Manhattan, and what Roy DeCarava was to post-Renaissance Harlem."

Later life
David Dinkins, the mayor of New York City at the time, proclaimed May 5, 1988, to be "Corky Lee Day", recognizing Lee's work as an important contribution to New York City communities.

Lee regularly supplied his photographs to the weekly local newspapers Downtown Express and The Villager during the 1990s and 2000s.

His wife, Margaret Dea, died of cancer around 2001. Lee died at Long Island Jewish Hospital in Forest Hills on January 27, 2021. He was 73, and developed complications of COVID-19 in the time leading up to his death. It was likely that he had become ill from patrolling with neighborhood watch groups, protecting Chinatown from anti-Asian violence.

Awards
1993, Photographer-Artist-in-Residence Award, Syracuse University
1993, Special Recognition Award, Asian American Journalists Association (AAJA)
 2002, New York Press Association Award
 2002, Artist-In-Residence, New York University's Asian/Pacific/American Studies Program & Institute
 2008, Pioneer Award, Organization of Chinese Americans
 2009, Susan Ahn Award for Civil Rights and Social Justice for Asian Americans and Pacific Islanders, Asian American Journalists Association
 2014, UC Regents Lecturer, University of California, Los Angeles Asian American Studies Center and Department & Luskin School of Public Affairs Urban Planning Department

References

External links
 Chinatown Beat a film by Yuko Torihara written and performed by Henry Chang.

1947 births
2021 deaths
American artists of Chinese descent
People from Queens, New York
Photographers from New York (state)
Queens College, City University of New York alumni
Deaths from the COVID-19 pandemic in New York (state)
Chinatown, Manhattan
20th-century American photographers
20th-century male artists
21st-century American photographers
21st-century male artists